Pierre Virion (1899–1988) was a French journalist and promoter of the Judeo-Masonic conspiracy theory.

References 

1899 births
1988 deaths
Anti-Masonry
French male non-fiction writers
Roman Catholic conspiracy theorists
Far-right politics in France
20th-century French journalists
French conspiracy theorists
20th-century French male writers